Pseudohemiodon amazonus is a species of armored catfish endemic to Brazil where it occurs in the lower Amazon basin.  This species grows to a length of  SL.

References
 

Loricariini
Fish of South America
Fish of Brazil
Endemic fauna of Brazil
Fish described in 1941